Queen Mary, Queen Marie, or Queen Maria may refer to:

People

12th century–13th century
 Maria Komnene, Queen of Hungary (1144–1190)
 Maria of Montpellier (1182–1213), queen consort of Aragon
 Maria of Montferrat (1192–1212), queen regnant of Jerusalem
 Maria Laskarina (1206–1270), queen consort of Hungary
 Marie de Coucy (1218–1285), queen consort of Scotland
 Marie of Brabant, Queen of France (1254–1322)
 María de Molina (1265–1321), queen consort of Castile and León
 Marie of Lusignan, Queen of Aragon (1273–1319)
 Maria of Bytom (1295–1317), queen consort of Hungary

14th century
 Marie of Luxembourg, Queen of France (1304–1324)
 Maria of Portugal, Queen of Castile (1313–1357)
 Maria of Navarre (1329–1347), queen consort of Aragon
 Maria de Luna (1358–1406), queen consort of Aragon
 Maria, Queen of Sicily (1363–1401)
 Mary, Queen of Hungary (1371–1395)

15th century
 Maria of Castile (1401–1458), queen consort of Aragon
 Maria of Aragon, Queen of Castile (1403–1445)
 Marie of Anjou (1404–1463), queen consort of France
 Mary of Guelders (1433–1463), queen consort of Scotland
 Maria of Serbia, Queen of Bosnia (1447–1498)
 Maria of Aragon, Queen of Portugal (1482–1517)
 Mary Tudor, Queen of France (1495–1533)

16th century
 Mary of Hungary (governor of the Netherlands) (1505–1558), queen consort of Hungary and Bohemia
 Mary of Guise (1515–1560), queen consort and regent of Scotland
 Mary I of England (1516–1558)
 Mary, Queen of Scots (1542–1587)
 Marie de' Medici (1575–1642), queen consort of France and Navarre
 Maria Eleonora of Brandenburg (1599–1655), queen consort of Sweden

17th century
 Henrietta Maria (1609–1669), queen consort of England, Scotland and Ireland
 Maria Theresa of Spain (1638–1683), queen consort of France
 Maria Francisca of Savoy (1646–1683), queen consort of Portugal
 Mary of Modena (1658–1718), queen consort of England
 Mary II of England (1662–1694)
 Marie Louise d'Orléans (1662–1689), queen consort of Spain
 Maria Sophia of Neuburg (1666–1699), queen consort of Portugal
 Maria Anna of Neuburg (1667–1740), queen consort of Spain
 Maria Anna of Austria (1683–1754), queen consort of Portugal
 Maria Luisa of Savoy (1688–1714), queen consort of Spain

18th century
 Marie Leszczyńska (1703–1768), queen consort of France
 Maria Amalia of Saxony (1724–1760), queen consort of Spain
 Juliana Maria of Brunswick-Wolfenbüttel (1729–1796), queen consort of Denmark
 Maria I of Portugal (1734–1816)
 Maria Luisa of Parma (1751–1819), queen consort of Spain
 Maria Carolina (1752–1814), queen consort of Naples
 Marie Antoinette (1755–1793), queen consort of France and Navarre
 Marie of Hesse-Kassel (1767–1852), queen consort of Denmark and Norway
 Marie Thérèse of France (1778–1851), queen consort of France (disputed)
 Maria Amalia of Naples and Sicily (1782–1866), queen consort of the French
 Marie Louise of Austria (1791–1847), queen consort of Italy, empress consort of the French
 Maria Isabel of Braganza (1797–1818), queen consort of Spain

19th century
 Maria Josepha Amalia of Saxony (1803–1829), queen consort of Spain
 Maria Christina of the Two Sicilies (1806–1878), queen consort of Spain
 Maria II of Portugal (1819–1853)
 Maria Eutokia Toaputeitou (died 1869), queen consort of Mangareva
 Marie Henriette of Austria (1836–1902), queen consort of the Belgians
 Maria Vittoria dal Pozzo (1847–1876), queen consort of Spain
 Maria Pia of Savoy (1847–1911), queen consort of Portugal
 Mary Thomas (labor leader), (c.1848–1905), known as "Queen Mary"
 Maria Christina of Austria (1858–1929), queen consort of Spain
 Mary of Teck (1867–1953), queen consort (1910–1936) of the United Kingdom and the British Dominions
 Marie of Romania (1875–1938)

20th century
 Maria of Yugoslavia (1900–1961)
 Marie-José of Belgium (1906–2001), queen consort of Italy
 Anne-Marie of Denmark (born 1946), queen consort of the Hellenes
 Karen Zerby (born 1946), uses the pseudonym "Queen Maria"

Other uses
 Queen Mary (beer cocktail)
 Queen Mary (ship): includes a list of ships with this name
 Queen Mary trailer
 Queen Mary University of London
 Queen Mary's Hospital (disambiguation)

See also
 Mary (disambiguation)
 Mary II (disambiguation)
 Queen Mary Land
 Saint Mary (disambiguation)